Allegiance is a Star Wars novel released in January 2007 by Del Rey. The book was written by Timothy Zahn, and was followed in 2011 with Choices of One.

Story
The story is set just after Star Wars: Episode IV – A New Hope. The book's subject is, according to Zahn, "...three different people and groups with allegiance issues."

Synopsis
The story was told in three parallel threads which eventually intertwined in the later part of the book.

Five members of the Imperial Stormtroopers attached to the Imperial Star Destroyer Reprisal began to have doubt about their work after being made to participate in massacre of innocents on planet Teardrop. The planet had a rebel base, but evacuated just moments before the Reprisal arrived. The Imperial Security Bureau (ISB) officers in charge of the operations had the innocent people killed anyway. Back on board the Star Destroyer, the ISB Major Dreflin made a mistake of pushing the stormtrooper too far and ended up killed by his own weapon. The five stormtroopers aboard realized official channels would get them nowhere, and managed to escape on board the ship Suwantek. While on the run, their sense of honor and duty led them to seemingly unrelated incidents where they rescued local populace, and subsequently pursued a link to a pirate group named the Bloodscars operating in the Shelsha Sector.

Leia was dispatched to the Shelsha Sector to meet three local representatives of the Rebellion. Luke, Han and Chewbacca went along as her escorts. They separated to pursue different leads, the men to investigate pirate attacks on the Rebel supply line, and Leia to a negotiation that the governor of Shelsha sector was going to declare independence and join the Rebellion.

Mara Jade was investigating corrupt Imperial moffs, and clues from stolen valuable artworks led her to the Shelsha Sector.

It was indicated in the original Thrawn trilogy novels that Rebels (Luke Skywalker, Han Solo, Chewbacca, and Leia Organa) met Mara Jade for the first time during the events of that same trilogy. As such, despite being in the same place at the same time on more than one occasion, the Rebels and Mara Jade did not actually see each other.

Continuity
 The book includes a cameo appearance of a character based on Stacey, the heroine of the Pink Five series of fanfilms, marking the first time a fan-created Star Wars character has ever crossed into the Expanded Universe.
 The first hardcover printing has the time period mislabeled as taking place during the Rise of the Empire/Prequel Trilogy period instead of the correct time period, Rebellion Era/Classic Trilogy.

Sequel

Choices of One is a Star Wars novel written by Zahn, released by Del Rey on July 19, 2011. The sequel to Zahn's 2007 novel Allegiance, it is set between the events of the films Star Wars: A New Hope and The Empire Strikes Back and features Luke Skywalker, Princess Leia, Han Solo, Mara Jade, and the villain Nuso Esva.

References

External links
StarWars.com First Look
Official Announcement
Star Wars Message Board Topic

Allegiance on Wookieepedia

2007 American novels
2007 science fiction novels
Novels by Timothy Zahn
Star Wars Legends novels
Del Rey books
Military science fiction novels
Space opera novels